The 2018 Winter Paralympics, officially the XII Paralympic Winter Games, or the 12th Winter Paralympics, were held from 9 to 18 March 2018 in PyeongChang, South Korea. 80 events in 6 winter sport disciplines were contested.

Alpine skiing

Women's events

Men's events

Biathlon

Women's events

Men's events

Cross-country skiing

Women's events

Men's events

Relay events

Para ice hockey

Snowboarding

Women's events

Men's events

Wheelchair curling

See also
 2018 Winter Paralympics medal table

References

medal winners
Lists of Paralympic medalists
Winter Paralympics medalists
South Korea sport-related lists